Agaléga is a dependency of Mauritius which consists of two outer islands located in the Indian Ocean, about  north of Mauritius Island. Under the Constitution of Mauritius, Agaléga is a constituent island of the Republic of Mauritius. Although the island has been ceded to India on a basis that has not yet been revealed but appears to be military, it still remains, as explicitly defined by the Constitution of Mauritius, part of the Sovereignty of Mauritius, together with the following islands “Rodrigues, Tromelin, Cargados Carajos (Saint Brandon), Chagos Archipelago (…) Diego Garcia and other islands included in the State of Mauritius”.

Similarly to other Mauritian islands such as St. Brandon, Agaléga is run directly by the Prime Minister of Mauritius himself through the Prime Minister's Office to the Outer Island Development Corporation (OIDC). The population of the islands in 2018 was 274 down from 289 in July 2011 amidst reports in the press that pregnant Agalegans are allegedly not allowed to give birth in Agalega, possibly to avoid another Chagos-type problem in the future given that there are more than 200 Indian builders on site. The North Island is home to the islands' airstrip and the capital Vingt-Cinq. The islands are known for their production of coconuts which was their main industry and, also, for the Agalega day gecko.

A 2015 memorandum of understanding on India–Mauritius military cooperation envisaged developing the Agaléga islands for an Indian military base. Local residents vocally opposed construction of the base as being a threat to local employment, self-determination, creole language (Agalega Creole), creole culture and Mauritian sovereignty.

Etymology
There are three different explanations for the name Agaléga.

 One hypothesis is that the Portuguese explorer, Dom Pedro Mascarenhas, named Agaléga and the island of Sainte Marie (off the east coast of Madagascar) in honour of his two sailboats, the "" and the "" in 1512, when he discovered Mauritius and Réunion Island.
 Another, more probable explanation relates to the Galician explorer João da Nova, who discovered the islands in 1501 while working for the Portuguese.
 A further, less likely, idea comes from a story in Sir Robert Scott's book Limuria: The Lesser Dependencies of Mauritius, where he describes the 1509 discovery of the Islands by the Portuguese mariner Diogo Lopes de Sequeira. According to this version, Diogo named the Islands , with the "" referring to putative gale-force winds hypothetically modelling the coasts of both islands. Scott suggests that maps of the region represented the islands initially as Gale, metamorphosing into Galera, Galega and finally Agalega.

A proxy evolution within the Portuguese system in the Indian Ocean points out "As Ilhas do Almirante Vasco da Gama" (in short, "Amirante Islands" where de L with Celtic pronunciation was dropped, or more broadly the Seychelles Archipelago), along with "As Ilhas do Almirante Pedro Mascarenhas" (nowadays referred as Mascarene Islands), as its original context, a combination which have not included Agalega Islands, in the middle of these two admiral-alike designations. Then again, "As Ilhas da Almirante Galega", a reference to Isabel Barreto, the first woman in the history of the navy who have reached the rank of admiral, was the novelty picked down when the problem solving of the islands nomination have been unleashed. Her life pathway matches the context of have been living along with two admirals, surely in two different marriages. So, the Archipelago of Agalega shares in the Indian Ocean geography a similar context. Thus, to supress an original lack of nomination and at the same time to avoid to step down from the admiral standard, of the two more nearby patrons, all together points in this direction. "A Galega", as an expression of the Portuguese rural world is applied to any person who have born northwards of the river Douro, Portuguese or from the Kingdom of Galicia, both with origin in the Roman Gallaecia.

History

As with the Mascarene islands, these islands may have been known to Arab and Malay sailors, although no written records have been found to confirm this. Agalega, or Galega, was examined by Captain Briggs of HMS Clorinde, on the 12th of January, 1811, who seems to have fixed its location accurately, which was previously not the case. The landing was found to be difficult on account of the heavy surf, the island being surrounded by a reef. A former French privateer was, at this time, settled on the island, having under him a colony of negroes, who cultivated part of the land with maize and wheat.

The first settlement on the islands was founded by M. de Rosemond. Upon his arrival in August 1808, he discovered the bodies of two castaways and a bottle containing notes written by one of them, the privateer Robert Dufour. The only hill on the islands, Montagne d'Emmerez, derives its name from the second shipwrecked sailor, a Mauritian called Adelaide d'Emmerez.

Economic, infrastructural and political development of the islands didn't begin until the arrival of Auguste Le Duc in 1827, a French administrator sent by M. Barbé to organise production of coconut oil and copra. There still exists a number of historical monuments dating from the period 1827 to 1846, made by slaves: the village Vingt-Cinq (named after the 25 lashes that were given to rebellious slaves), the Slave Dungeons, an Oil Mill, a cemetery for Blacks and a cemetery for Whites, among others. Auguste Le Duc also began construction of a bridge between the two islands, although it was swept away by severe weather.

Father Victor Malaval brought the Catholic Church to the islands in 1897 as the first missionary. An improvised chapel was built on the South Island.

The origin of its inhabitants was influenced by the political ructions in the world at the time. Mauritius became a British colony in 1810 and the abolition of the slave trade then the abolition of slavery in 1835 followed by the arrival of unskilled Asian labourers. The slaves themselves were of Malagasy origin or from Madras in India whilst some were freed from slave ships and others were from the slave trading ports of the Comoros Islands.

Legends such as "Calèche Blanc" and "Princesse Malgache" are part of the folklore of the islands, as well as the coded language of "Madam langaz Seret" which has come down from the time of slavery. This language is a mixture of French and Mauritian Creole where every syllable is doubled with the first consonants replaced by the "g" (e.g. "Français" becomes "frangrançaisgais"). The origin, purpose and reasons for the evolution of this specific language remains unclear.

Today, the population consists of around 300 people, known locally as Agaléens ("Agalegans"), who speak Creole. Catholicism is the dominant religion. It is reported that more than 10,000 Agalegans today live in Mauritius itself.

Geography

The soil is likely coral. The culmination is at the top of the hill Emmer on the island in the north. April is the hottest month of the year. The tropical climate is conducive to the development of mangrove and coconut trees that cover the two islets.

Economy

Agaléga is managed by a company of the State of Mauritius, the Outer Island Development Company (OIDC), a company which develops remote islands. The company delegates a resident manager, a kind of steward, who is the supreme authority on the two islets. The economy of the archipelago is based primarily on the exportation of coconut oil.

Loss of sovereignty 
Sovereignty is linked to the notion of nationhood, independence, territorial borders, internal decision-taking, national pride and patriotism. It is also intimately linked and derived, in this case, from the Constitution of Mauritius which lists Agalega as being a constituent part of the sovereignty of the Republic of Mauritius. In the absence of any freedom of information (FOIA) laws in Mauritius, it is difficult to factually confirm but the construction of an Indian military base in Agalega for the Indian Navy and for military aircraft of the Indian Air Force appears to have been completed and is a fait accompli. CSIS in May 2022 released images of aeroplane hangars on Agaléga for India's P-8I Poseidon aircraft which were nearing completion in November 2022.

The extent of the loss of sovereignty with the Indian "occupation" of Agalega with regard to the nationhood of Mauritius (running down the population of creoles on the island by not allowing births is drawing parallels with the British Colonials in the Chagos Archipelago), its independence (with regard to Mauritius' inability hence to avoid being drawn into a global nuclear war and becoming an unwilling nuclear holocaust victim) is difficult to assess given the secrecy of the military agreement with India but this has affected national pride and the patriotism of Mauritian citizens as perceiving this militarisation of Agalega as being modern day Indian neo-colonialism.

In the same year that Mauritius signed its agreement with India, in 2015, India also signed a military agreement with Seychelles in respect of Assumption Island. The Seychelles military agreement (with a same length runway) had clauses about whether or not Indian troops would fall under Seychellois or Indian military law. It was Indian military law.

Cost of detachment of Agalega from Mauritius 
The cost to the people from Agalega of being detached from their island so that India's military outpost can be installed has not yet been revealed. In Chagos' case, the financial "costs in 1965 were estimated at £10 million" (approximately £250 million today) excluding the United States' "secret contribution to the BIOT enterprise via waiving costs associated with Britain's nuclear weapons acquisitions, the financial costs for Britain to create BIOT was high. Acquiring Agaléga would have increased Britain's financial burden, at a time when it was winding down its vast empire and reigning in its defense spending." This off-the-balance-sheet US nuclear help will almost certainly have doubled the initial cost to around £500 million in today's money. Mauritius does not produce nor hold nuclear weapons and the monetary quid pro quo relating to major infrastructural projects in Mauritius has also not been revealed. By way of example, "India has agreed to grant a Line of Credit (LOC) of USD 200 million to Mauritius as regards the Light Rail Transit project. An additional amount to the tune of USD 450 million from EXIM Bank of India at a very low interest rate will also be granted."</ref>

Infrastructure
Most homes are in the main villages of Vingt-Cinq and La Fourche on the North Island, and St. Rita on the South Island. The road connecting the different localities is sandy and coral. The North Island is home to an airstrip, a government primary school "Jacques Le Chartier", the police station, the weather station, the central telecommunications office (Mauritius Telecom) and the health service. There is no running water on the island. Drinking water comes from rainwater collected by gutters. Water for other uses is sourced from wells. Electricity is supplied by generators running on diesel, with supply limited to certain hours. The company that manages the remote islands, such as Agaléga and St Brandon, is working on a project to ensure power supply to these islands, via submarine connection.

Agaléga is connected to Mauritius by air and sea. The civilian airstrip on the island in the north allows takeoff and landing of small aircraft. There is now a new 10,000 foot long modern airstrip suitable for jet aircraft. There is no functional port on the islands, only a pier at St James Anchorage on the island's north.

Health services are provided by a health officer and a midwife. Doctors from Mauritius make short tours throughout the year. The Agaléens also receive a visit from a magistrate during the year.

For education, there is a primary school for the young, but pupils then continue their education in secondary schools on the island of Mauritius.

References

External links

Government of Mauritius - Agalega

Outer Islands of Mauritius
Islands of Mauritius
Sovereignty
Mauritius
Indian military engineers